Đurašević (also transliterated Djurašević) is a Serbian surname, derived from the male given name Đuraš (Jurasz, Juraš or Djuraš), a variant of the name Đurađ. It may refer to:

 The Crnojević noble family, descending from the Đurašević
 Đurađ Đurašević (15th century), nobleman in Zeta
 Aleksa Đurašević (15th century), nobleman in Zeta
 Crnoje Đurašević (15th century), nobleman in Zeta
 Đurašin Đurašević (15th century), nobleman in Zeta

References

Serbian surnames
Slavic-language surnames
Patronymic surnames